Mimorista trisemalis is a moth in the family Crambidae, found in Bolivia. It was described by Paul Dognin in 1910.

References

Moths described in 1910
Spilomelinae